Ulysses S. Grant-Smith (November 18, 1870 – August 27, 1959) was an American career diplomat who served as Minister to Albania and Minister to Uruguay during the interwar period.

Biography
He was originally from Washington County, Pennsylvania.  A career foreign service officer, he began serving as a diplomat in 1903, and arrived in Copenhagen on 18 July 1917, to take up the position of Counselor at the US Legation there. Less than five months later, upon Minister Maurice Egan's departure on 16 December, he became Chargé d'Affaires and the ranking US representative in Denmark. He remained Chargé for over a year, until the arrival of the new US Minister, Norman Hapgood, on  April 16, 1919. On  September 18, 1919, Grant-Smith left Copenhagen, and was declared eligible for a new diplomatic assignment. On December 4, 1919, he was appointed US Commissioner to Hungary, signing the U.S.–Hungarian Peace Treaty in 1921. In 1922, he became the first U.S. Minister to Albania. Grant-Smith was appointed to the post in September 1922 by President Warren G. Harding, and arrived in Tirana in December of the same year. He served through February 8, 1925, and was then made Minister to Uruguay from 1925 to 1929.

Ulysses Grant-Smith died on August 27, 1959 in Washington, Pennsylvania.

References

External links
 

1870 births
1959 deaths
Ambassadors of the United States to Albania
Ambassadors of the United States to Uruguay
United States Foreign Service personnel
People from Washington County, Pennsylvania
20th-century American diplomats